Jaider Romero  (born May 22, 1982) is a Colombian football defender that plays for Atlético Junior in the Liga Postobón.

See also
Football in Colombia
List of football clubs in Colombia

References

External links
Profile at BDFA.com.ar

1982 births
Living people
Colombian footballers
Real Cartagena footballers
Valledupar F.C. footballers
Atlético Junior footballers
Association football defenders
People from Valledupar